Swainsonia casta, common name the chaste mitre,  is a species of sea snail, a marine gastropod mollusk in the family Mitridae, the miters or miter snails.

Description
The length of the shell varies between 20 mm and 55 mm.

Distribution
This marine species occurs off East Africa  to Japan; off Pitcairn and Polynesia

References

 Poppe G.T. & Tagaro S.P. (2008). Mitridae. pp. 330–417, in: G.T. Poppe (ed.), Philippine marine mollusks, volume 2. Hackenheim: ConchBooks. 848 pp.

External links
 

Mitridae
Gastropods described in 1791